Saint Septimius of Iesi (d. 307) was the first bishop of Iesi, a martyr, and a saint.

Septimius was born in Germany, and after an education in the liberal arts, began a military career. After he converted to Christianity, he parted with his family, who did not convert, and went to Italy where he worked as a minister in Milan. He was forced out of Milan during the Diocletianic Persecution in 303. He later made his way to Rome, where the miracles he performed impressed Pope Marcellus I so much that he made Septimius bishop of Iesi.

Septimius established Iesi Cathedral. A local magistrate, Florentius, opposed the dedication of the cathedral after Septimius refused to make a sacrifice to the pagan gods. Florentius subsequently ordered Septimius to be decapitated.

The body of Septimius was exhumed in 1469, although the cult of Septimius dated from much earlier. A new altar was consecrated to the saint at the cathedral in 1623.

Septimius is the patron saint of Iesi. His feast day was on September 5 until 1623, when it was changed to September 22.

Notes and references

Sources
 Santi e Beati: San Settimio de Jesi 

307 deaths
4th-century Romans
4th-century Christian martyrs
Bishops in le Marche
Year of birth unknown
Septimii
Iesi
Diocletianic Persecution
Saints